Scarlett Stevens is an Australian singer/drummer from the indie band San Cisco, The Flairz and grunge band Ghetto Crystals. She has performed on recordings by Bob Evans and Illy. She is the daughter of Phil Stevens, co-founder of Jarrah Records and manager of John Butler Trio and The Waifs.

Music career

Stevens has been playing drums since she was ten years old, she started a garage rock band, the Flairz, at age eleven with a two friends, John and Dion Mariani (the son and nephew of Dom Mariani), both of whom played guitar, vocals and bass guitar. They played their first live show in December 2003, performing around Western Australia, in between school commitments. The band recorded and released two EPs and an album and performed at SXSW. In November 2009, at the end of high school, the Flairz disbanded and Stevens started jamming with other musicians around the same age. She was asked to play on a friend's recording, which led to the formation of King George, which later became San Cisco.

In a 2013 interview with Modern Drummer magazine Stevens recalls that her initial introduction to the drums happened when she met Jack Johnson's drummer, Adam Topol, who showed her how to play a basic rock beat. Following which he invited her to perform onstage for one song at the Forum Theatre in Melbourne and then again at Bonnaroo Music Festival the following year.

In 2014 she established a side project, a two-piece electronic hip-hop group, Ghetto Crystals, with Doug May (the guitarist and brother of Abbe May).

Discography

Singles

Featured singles

Awards and nominations

National Live Music Awards
The National Live Music Awards (NLMAs) are a broad recognition of Australia's diverse live industry, celebrating the success of the Australian live scene. The awards commenced in 2016.

|-
|  National Live Music Awards of 2017
| Scarlett Stevens (San Cisco)
| Live Drummer of the Year
| 
|-

West Australian Music Industry Awards
The West Australian Music Industry Awards are annual awards celebrating achievements for Western Australian music. They commenced in 1985. San Cisco won six awards in 2012.

 (wins only)
|-
| 2012
| Scarlett Stevens
| Drummer/Percussionist of the Year 
| 
|-

References

1992 births
Australian people of Italian descent
21st-century drummers
21st-century women musicians
APRA Award winners
Australian drummers
Australian indie pop musicians
Living people
Musicians from Western Australia
People from Fremantle
Women drummers